Taklamakania is a genus of asaphid trilobites of the family Raphiophoridae that lived during the late Caradoc of Inner Mongolia, China. Like all raphiophorids it is blind, with a headshield (or cephalon) that is subsemicircular, carrying genal spines and a forward directed spine on the central raised area (or glabella), with the front of the glabella inflated and the natural fracture lines (or sutures) of the cephalon coinciding with its margin. It is easily distinguished from most other raphiophorids by the 3 thorax segments. Pseudampyxina, Nanshanaspis, and Kongqiangheia also have only 3 such segments, but all three lack the frontal spine that emanates from the glabellum of Taklamakania species. All other raphiophorid genera have at least 5 thorax segments. Three species, T. tarimensis, T. tarimheensis, and T. xinjiangensis, have been assigned to this genus so far.

Etymology 
The generic name Taklamakania refers to the Taklamakan desert, the area where its fossils were found.  The species epithet tarimensis is also a geographic derivation in reference to the Tarim basin, which includes the Taklamakan desert.

Evolution 
Adult T. tarimensis are almost indistinguishable from juvenile Ampyxina powelli, and it is assumed that Taklamakania developed from Ampyxina through paedomorphosis.

Junior homonym 
 T. lepetzi = Paranemia bicolor (Ferrer & Yvinec, 2004) a tenebrionid beetle

References 

Raphiophoridae
Asaphida genera
Ordovician trilobites of Asia
Fossils of China